Julia Brown  is a Scottish actress and singer. She stars as Lois Bennett in the BBC series World on Fire (2019). She also appeared in the CBBC series M.I. High (2014) and the crime drama Shetland (2018–2021).

Early life
Brown was brought up in Edinburgh. She attended George Heriot's School. She was a member of her school's Chamber Choir and participated in school plays and local theatre productions before enrolling in the MGA Academy of Performing Arts.

Career
Brown was 16 when she auditioned for M.I. High on CBBC, making her television debut and joining the main cast as Keri Summers for its seventh and final series. She was subsequently signed by Ruth Young at United Agents; she is also represented by Model Team. Brown had a recurring role as Molly Kilmuir in the fourth and sixth series of the BBC One crime drama Shetland. She also had a role as Ecgwyn in the third and fourth series of the Netflix medieval drama The Last Kingdom.

In 2018, it was announced Brown would star as Lois Bennett in Peter Bowker's World War II drama World on Fire, which premiered as a miniseries on BBC One in 2019 before being renewed for a second series. She starred as Katherine Walker in the 2020 television film Anthony by Jimmy McGovern for the BBC.

Filmography

References

External links

Living people
1997 births
21st-century Scottish actresses
People educated at George Heriot's School
Scottish female models
Scottish stage actresses
Scottish television actresses